The University of Regina is a public research university located in Regina, Saskatchewan, Canada. Founded in 1911 as a private denominational high school of the Methodist Church of Canada, it began an association with the University of Saskatchewan as a junior college in 1925, and was disaffiliated by the Church and fully ceded to the university in 1934; in 1961 it attained degree-granting status as the Regina Campus of the University of Saskatchewan. It became an autonomous university in 1974. The University of Regina has an enrolment of over 15,000 full and part-time students. The university's student newspaper, The Carillon, is a member of CUP.

The University of Regina is well-reputed for having a focus on experiential learning and offers internships, professional placements and practicums in addition to cooperative education placements in 41 programs. This experiential learning and career-preparation focus was further highlighted when, in 2009 the University of Regina launched the UR Guarantee Program, a unique program guaranteeing participating students a successful career launch after graduation by supplementing education with experience to achieve specific educational, career and life goals. Partnership agreements with provincial crown corporations, government departments and private corporations have helped the University of Regina both place students in work experience opportunities and help gain employment post-study.

History

Origins

The University of Regina is a non-denominational university, which grew out of Regina College, founded in 1911. In direct response to the award of the University of Saskatchewan to Saskatoon rather than Regina, the Methodist Church of Canada established Regina College in 1911 on College Avenue in Regina, Saskatchewan, starting with an enrolment of 27 students; it was adjacent to the now long-defunct St Chad's College (a theological seminary for the training of Anglican clergy) and Qu'Appelle Diocesan School, also on College Avenue. James Henry Puntin (architect) designed several buildings on campus including: Regina Methodist College (1910); East & West Towers (1914); Ladies Residence (1914); Gymnasium (1925); Power Plant (1927); Music & Arts Building (1928). "In 1928, Darke Hall was built on College Avenue, [d]escribed...as "an admirable theatre, one which few cities can rival."

In 1934 Regina College became part of the University of Saskatchewan. The University of Saskatchewan a single, public provincial university created in 1907 was modeled on the American state university, with an emphasis on extension work and applied research. The governance was modeled on the University of Toronto Act, 1906 which established a bicameral system of university government consisting of a senate (faculty), responsible for academic policy, and a board of governors (citizens) exercising exclusive control over financial policy and having formal authority in all other matters. The president, appointed by the board, was to provide a link between the 2 bodies and to perform institutional leadership. In the early part of this century, professional education expanded beyond the traditional fields of theology, law and medicine. Graduate training based on the German-inspired American model of specialized course work and the completion of a research thesis was introduced.

Regina College commenced a formal association with the University of Saskatchewan as a junior college offering accredited university courses in 1925 though continuing as a denominational college of the now-United Church of Canada, the successor to the Methodist Church. Regina College continued as a Junior College until 1959, when it received full degree-granting status as a second campus of the University of Saskatchewan.

However, in 1934, the United Church was financially hard pressed by the Great Depression and in any case its history from the great Egerton Ryerson of urgent advocacy of universal free public education made its involvement in private schools anomalous. It accordingly fully surrendered Regina College to the University of Saskatchewan. Regina College and its successor Regina Campus of the University of Saskatchewan and University of Regina have—possibly unawares—retained the Methodist motto "as one who serves" (Luke 22.27).

The policy of university education initiated in the 1960s responded to population pressure and the belief that higher education was a key to social justice and economic productivity for individuals and for society. In 1961 the college was renamed the University of Saskatchewan, Regina Campus. In 1974 it became the independent University of Regina.

The original United Church affiliation is, however, symbolically commemorated in the convocation furniture, resumed by the university for ceremonial use from one of the last downtown United Churches, which closed in the 1990s.

University of Saskatchewan affiliation

With the transfer of control to the University of Saskatchewan the range of courses offered was somewhat broadened. During this period Campion and Luther Colleges, which maintained private high schools in Regina under the auspices respectively of the Roman Catholic and Lutheran churches, also retained junior college status in affiliation with the University of Saskatchewan; the Anglican Church (then known as the Church of England in Canada), whose St Chad's College had operated a theological training facility in Regina but had never established substantial numbers in Canada west of Ontario compared with larger denominations, meanwhile merged with Emmanuel College in Saskatoon and withdrew from tertiary education in Regina.

The upgrading process accelerated in 1961 when the college was granted full-degree-granting status as the Regina Campus of the University of Saskatchewan and students completing degrees at Regina Campus were granted degrees of the University of Saskatchewan.

Regina Campus

The arts and sciences programs evolved with the growth of Regina Campus, which held its first convocation in 1965. The new campus was begun in 1966 on Wascana Lake, to the southeast of the old campus whose buildings, however, remain in use: the old Girls' Residence is now used by the Regina Conservatory of Music; the Normal School, having at various times housed not only the teacher-training facility that is now the university's Department of Education but the Saskatchewan Museum of Natural History, war-training facilities during World War II when it was temporarily resumed by the federal crown and latterly the university's Fine Arts Department, is now the Canada-Saskatchewan Soundstage.

The original design of Regina Campus (as of Wascana Centre itself) and its initial buildings, in a stark concrete modernist style, were by Minoru Yamasaki, the architect of the original World Trade Center in New York.

Yamasaki's original vision 

The Dr. John Archer Library, the main library of the university, was opened in 1967, one of the original three buildings of the new campus (the others being the classroom and laboratory buildings), and named after Dr. John Archer in 1999. Further building has been substantially in accord with Yamasaki's vision, notwithstanding some controversy over the years as to the suitability of its austere style for the featureless Regina plain; by 1972 with the demolition of Yamasaki's 1955 Pruitt–Igoe housing project in St. Louis, Missouri—such demolition being considered by some to be the beginning of postmodern architecture—Yamasaki's modernist aesthetic was already somewhat passé in the view of many architects.

Campion College and later Luther College, which like Regina College had also been denominational junior colleges affiliated with the University of Saskatchewan, established "federated college" status on the model of Victoria, Trinity, St Michael's and University Colleges at the University of Toronto (and ultimately the collegiate system of Oxford and Cambridge) and built facilities at the new campus. (St Chad's, a fourth denominational college in Regina, operated by the Anglican Church of Canada on the former Anglican diocesan property on College Avenue immediately to the east of Regina College, merged with Emmanuel College on the Saskatoon campus in 1964 and, after a period of continuing to operate its private girls' high school closed its Regina facilities in 1970.)

In September 2000, the 600 City of Regina Wing of the Royal Canadian Air Force Association, erected a bronze war memorial plaque dedicated to the former personnel of No. 2 Initial Training School, who trained in the Conservatory of Music building during the Second World War.

An independent University of Regina

Because there was no follow-through regarding plans by the University of Saskatchewan to establish additional faculties at Regina (rather than the Saskatoon campus), the Faculty Council was formed to study the feasibility of creating an autonomous institution. A Royal Commission under a Supreme Court of Canada justice, Emmett Hall, found there to be "two campus groups warring within the bosom of a single university."

As a result, the University of Regina was established as an independent institution on 1 July 1974 and the first University of Regina degrees were conferred at the spring convocation in 1975—although its development was slow until the 21st century, when a renewed burst of building and expansion occurred. That being said, several of the university's faculties are significantly smaller in the 21st century than they were in the 1970s as priorities have shifted from liberal arts to vocational training.

The original Regina College buildings on College Avenue continue in use; the old Girls' Residence is now the Regina Conservatory of Music; in 1997 the Fine Arts Department moved from the old Normal School building to the new W.A. Riddell Centre and the Normal School was substantially renovated to become the Canada-Saskatchewan Soundstage.

The campus has experienced a recent spurt of growth and expansion, having been static for some two decades after the construction of the Language Institute at the end of the 1970s. Since the late 1990s, several new buildings have been added including the Dr. William A. Riddell Centre; the Wakpá Tower (South) and Paskwāw Tower (North) Residences; the Centre for Kinesiology, Health & Sport; First Nations University of Canada and Research & Innovation Centre; along with a significant expansion of the Education Building.

The building of the Wakpá Tower (South) and Paskwāw Tower (North) Residences also involved a significant redevelopment of the landscaping of the campus around a new oval as an aesthetic and community hub of campus. Future plans include construction on the east side of the Ring Road. The goal is to accommodate an enrolment of 25,000.

In the summer of 2005 the University of Regina hosted the 2005 Canada Games. Many events took place in the newly completed state-of-the-art Centre for Kinesiology, Health and Sport. The administration of the games proceeded from the University of Regina Students Union offices and various other loc

The Regina Research Park is located immediately adjacent to the main campus and conducts many of its initiatives in conjunction with university departments. In recent years, local benefactors have substantially endowed the university with scholarships and chairs in various disciplines.

In 2015, The University of Regina opened La Cité universitaire francophone (La Cité) which is the first French University in Saskatchewan. The university offers French language classes for French students learning the language and the culture of la francophone and Fransaskois. It also offers La Rotonde which is a place to learn about French culture.

Federated colleges, regional colleges and associates

The university has three federated colleges:
 Campion College
 First Nations University of Canada
 Luther College
Campion and Luther colleges had been high schools offering junior college courses accredited by the University of Saskatchewan on the same basis as the old Regina College, out of premises located elsewhere in Regina. Campion College became a junior college of the University of Saskatchewan like Regina College in 1923, later severed that association in favour of one with St Boniface College in Manitoba, and returned to federated college status with the University of Saskatchewan in 1964. It built its facilities on the new Regina Campus in 1968 and subsequently vacated its original high school premises on 23rd Avenue. Its Regina Campus building was designed in accordance with Minoru Yamasaki's original plan for the campus, with a "podium," contemplated as eventually being joined with the campus-wide ground floor. Thus far this has not occurred and Campion's building remains isolated.

Luther College opened its building on the new Regina Campus in 1971 but continues to operate its high school on Royal Street, on the site of the first Government House of the North-West Territories. By this point the original Yamasaki plan for the campus was being reconsidered and the Luther College complex is isolated to the east of the principal campus buildings, though it is connected by an all-weather corridor via Campion College.

The First Nations University of Canada grew out of the Saskatchewan Indian Federated College, established in 1976 and then housed in a building immediately west of College West. It was an original foundation at the University of Regina. Its new building to the east of Luther College replaced its original facilities to the west of College West and was opened by Prince Edward in 2003 and visited by the Queen in 2005 when she installed a commemorative stone to symbolise the special relationship between Canada's First Nations and the sovereign.

The United Church, having vacated tertiary education in Regina when it ceded Regina College to the University of Saskatchewan, and the Anglican Church, having removed its St Chad's College from Regina to Saskatoon, do not maintain any presence at the University of Regina. The Christian and Missionary Alliance Church formerly maintained the residential Canadian Bible College in Regina and offered some of its courses for accreditation with the University of Regina but was unable to obtain university status in Saskatchewan and vacated to Calgary in 2003.

Additionally, the University of Regina has two "Affiliated Colleges:" The Gabriel Dumont Institute and the Saskatchewan Polytechnic (formerly Saskatchewan Institute of Applied Science and Technology, SIAST). The university also has two "Associated Colleges:" Athol Murray College of Notre Dame and Briercrest College and Seminary. These institutions offer collaborative, associated, or articulated programs in conjunction with the University of Regina.

Saskatchewan's network of Regional Colleges further extend program delivery across the province. The University of Regina offers courses through Cumberland College, Northlands College, North West Regional College, Great Plains College, Carlton Trail Regional College, Parkland College, and the South East Regional College.

Faculties
The University of Regina has ten faculties and one school that offer a variety of programs at the certificate, diploma, undergraduate and graduate degree levels.

The University of Regina also has one graduate school, the Johnson-Shoyama Graduate School of Public Policy. It delivers Masters and Doctoral programs in conjunction with the University of Saskatchewan.

The University of Regina also offers a number of pre-professional transfer programs with other universities and professional colleges: Agriculture and Bioresources, Chiropractic, Dentistry, Law, Medicine, Nutrition, Occupational Therapy, Optometry, Pharmacy, Physical Therapy, and Veterinary Medicine.

At the centre of a predominantly English speaking campus, La Cité universitaire francophone at the University of Regina offers a wide range of French programs, services and activities. La Cité directs and supports research projects related to francophones in minority situations, as well as unique university-community initiatives that contribute to the development of the Fransaskois community.

Co-operative education
The University of Regina is the one of the universities with co-operative education in Saskatchewan. Many of the university undergraduate students are enrolled in the co-op program, with the highest percentage being in the faculties of science and engineering. The Faculty of Arts offers an innovative internship program for its undergraduate students.

Residences

 
Regina College originally housed male and female student residences which were converted to academic use when the college became affiliated with the University of Saskatchewan in 1934. (The old Girls' Residence now accommodates the Regina Conservatory of Music.)

The Main (Wascana) Campus has residence space for about 1,200 students on-campus. Each bedroom is single-occupant, but many spaces on campus are designed to facilitate double occupancy, increasing capacity if required to address high demand without building additional residence space. The University of Regina residences have enlivened campus life from the somewhat bleak atmosphere of its founding days:

College West, the first on-campus residential accommodation, constructed in 1972. Offers apartment-style residence living. The building also houses classrooms, academic and business offices and the Bookstore, previously located first in the Classroom Building and then the Administration Humanities Building.
La Résidence in the Language Institute, gives priority to francophone students and those studying international languages. Offers dorm-style residence living. It maintains a French-speaking student atmosphere.
Wakpá Tower (South) and Paskwāw Tower (North) Residences, completed in 2004. Two symmetrical, twelve-floor towers housing apartment, studio, and dorm-style residences. These buildings form the centre pinnacle for the campus and also house both External/Alumni Relations and the Faculty of Graduate Studies & Research.
Kīšik Towers Residences, which opened in 2015. These twin 14-storey buildings offer two bedroom or four bedroom apartments, studio apartments and single dorms with private washrooms.
Luther College Residences, part of Luther College (the university's second federated college and second on-campus residence), opened in 1971. Luther offers more traditional dorm-style residences with some shared facilities.

The University of Regina internally designates a significant portion of spaces annually to incoming (first year) students in an effort to facilitate the growing number of non-resident (international, out-of-province, rural) students choosing to live on-campus.

Notable faculty and alumni
 Janice Acoose, author, newspaper columnist, filmmaker, indigenous language advocate and professor of indigenous and English literature at First Nations University
 Gordon Barnhart, SOM, author, former secretary of the House of Commons, and former Lieutenant-Governor of Saskatchewan
 Chris Bauman, Canadian Football player
 Roy Bonisteel, Laurier LaPierre, Knowlton Nash, Bill Cunningham, Val Sears, Myrna Kostash, Walter Stewart, John Sawatsky and Maggie Siggins, inter alios, have been visiting professors in the School of Journalism.
 Bob Boyer (1948–2004), visual artist, Professor and Head of Indian Fine Arts, SIFC.
 Gail Bowen, playwright and writer of mystery novels, was associate professor of English at First Nations University
 Lorne Calvert, Premier of Saskatchewan (2001–2007)
 Tevaughn Campbell, CFL and NFL player
 Ruth Chambers, ceramics and installation artist
 Sylvain Charlebois, food and agriculture expert
 Stefan Charles, NFL, AAF, and CFL player
 Theren Churchill, Canadian Football Player
 Jason Clermont, Canadian Football Player
 Saros Cowasjee, novelist, short story writer, critic, anthologist, screenwriter
 Jonathan Denis, Alberta MLA and Minister of Housing and Urban Affairs (1997)
 Shadia B. Drury, professor of political science and philosophy; Canada Research Chair in Social Justice
 Jo-Ann Episkenew, scholar of Indigenous health
 Holly Fay, artist and recipient of the National Visual Arts Advocacy Award
 Tamon George, Canadian Football player
 Chris Getzlaf, Canadian Football Player
 Joan Givner, biographer, novelist and short story writer
 Glenda Goertzen, children's author
 Ralph Goodale, Canadian High Commissioner to the United Kingdom, former member of Parliament, former Minister of Finance
Eric Grimson (BSc 1975), computer scientist and Chancellor of MIT
 Akiem Hicks, NFL Football Player (Chicago Bears)
 Kyle Herranen, Canadian Interdisciplinary Artist
 John Hewson, former Australian federal opposition leader
 Jorgen Hus, Canadian Football Player
 Nick Hutchins, Canadian Football player
 Brett Jones CFL and NFL Center (New York Giants)
 Trenna Keating, Canadian actress
 Donald Kendrick, 1970s music faculty member as to choir and organ; subsequently in successive universities and choir master in assorted cities in eastern Canada and the United States; presently in California
 Brendon LaBatte, Canadian Football Player
 Michelle LaVallee, curator, artist, and educator
 Jeannie Mah, ceramic artist
 Charity Marsh, assistant professor of Media Production and Studies, Canada Research Chair in Interactive Media and Performance
 Frank McCrystal, former Ram Head Coach
 Manjit Minhas, entrepreneur and television personality
 Ken Mitchell, novelist and playwright
 Ellen Moffat, artist
 Marc Mueller, former Ram Quarterback, current CFL coach
 John Cullen Nugent, sculptor
 Teale Orban, former Ram Quarterback
 Mitchell Picton, Canadian Football Player
 Noah Picton, former Ram Quarterback
 David Plummer, computer scientist and creator of Task Manager and Space Cadet Pinball
 Zenon Pylyshyn, Rutgers University, leading authority in cognitive science, Ph.D. (1963), Experimental Psychology, University of Saskatchewan (Regina Campus)
 Elizabeth Raum, Canadian oboist and composer
 Addison Richards, Canadian Football Player
 Jon Ryan, CFL and NFL punter
 Nicole Sarauer, Saskatchewan MLA and former Leader of the Official Opposition
 Christine Selinger, Canadian paracanoe gold medalist
 Daniel Scott Tysdal, poet
 Andrew Scheer, politician
 Jordan Sisco, CFL wide receiver
 Christina Stojanova, film historian
 Dione Taylor (BFA), a noted jazz singer
 Vianne Timmons, former president and vice-chancellor of the University of Regina
 Guy Vanderhaeghe, novelist
 Senator Pamela Wallin, former national broadcaster and Canadian Consul in New York
 Lee Ward, PhD., noted political scientist

Sports

The University of Regina is a member of U Sports and fields men and women's teams in various sports. Its teams bear the name "Cougars" in all sports, except the Regina Rams, which were originally a community junior football team competing in PJFC football without affiliation with the university, and who joined University ranks in 1999 as a member of the Canada West Conference of U Sports. Men's varsity teams include the Regina Rams (football), basketball, cross country, hockey, swimming, track and field, volleyball and wrestling. Women's varsity teams include basketball, cross country, hockey, soccer, swimming, track and field, volleyball, and wrestling. The University of Regina is also home to several varsity club teams, including cheerleading, curling, dance team, rowing, men's rugby sevens, women's rugby sevens, women's softball, synchronized swimming, ultimate, and triathlon.

In the summer of 2005, the university hosted the Canada Summer Games.

Media
The university's student newspaper is The Carillon. It for many years was an organ of radical student dissent and in the 1960s and 70s frequently had a very high community profile as its editorial postures occasioned vigorous denunciation by university administration figures and in the conservative general press. As student mores in subsequent generations have become less disputatious The Carillon has evolved into a less political paper which currently is a somewhat conventional newsletter of campus affairs.

The university is home to the School of Journalism, which was one of the first established in western Canada. The School publishes a student periodical, The Crow, and hosts the annual Minifie lecture, in honour of one of Canada's most illustrious journalists, James M. Minifie (1900–1974).

The University of Regina does not have its own campus radio station, although the independent community radio station CJTR-FM actively solicits volunteers among the school's student body.

The University of Regina is home to the Interactive Media and Performance Labs (IMP Labs), which includes programming for the student body as well as members of the community. The Labs have been particularly recognized through the IMP Labs Hip Hop Project with Scott Collegiate. The directors of this program, Dr. Charity Marsh and Chris Beingessner, received the Lieutenant Governor's Arts Awards for Arts and Learning through the Saskatchewan Arts Board.

Aboriginal
The University of Regina provides services to Aboriginal people in more remote communities. The University of Regina's SUNTEP program was developed in partnership with specific Aboriginal communities to meet specific needs within Aboriginal communities. Aboriginal Elders are present on campus at University of Regina to provide social supports. Through the University of Regina's Kâspohtamatâtân Mentorship Program Aboriginal students act as role models to younger students still in their home communities. The University of Regina has established an Aboriginal Career Centre to assist with the transition to a fulfilling career.

Arms

See also
Regina Public Library
Higher education in Saskatchewan
University of Regina Press

Notes

Further reading
 James Pitsula 'As One Who Serves: The Making Of The University Of Regina' (Montreal:  McGill-Queen's University Press, June 1, 2006)
 James Pitsula. 'An Act of Faith: The Early Years of Regina College.' (Regina: Canadian Plains Research Center, 1988).

External links

 

 
Universities and colleges in Saskatchewan
Educational institutions established in 1974